Eton is a small Oceanic language of Vanuatu, in the southeast of Efate Island.

References

Central Vanuatu languages